Longchaeus is a genus of sea snails, marine gastropod mollusks in the family Pyramidellidae, the pyrams and their allies.

Species
Species within the genus Longchaeus include:
 Longchaeus achates (A. Gould, 1853)
 Longchaeus acus (Gmelin, 1791)
 Longchaeus adamsi (Carpenter, 1864)
 Longchaeus auricoma (Dall, 1889)
 Longchaeus bicolor Menke, 1854
  † Longchaeus canaliculatus (Gabb, 1873)
 Longchaeus candidus (Mörch, 1875)
 Longchaeus conicus (C. B. Adams, 1852)
 Longchaeus eburneus (Laseron, 1959)
 Longchaeus folinii (Dall, 1889)
 Longchaeus inopinatus (Schander, 1994)
 Longchaeus insularum (Pilsbry, 1922)
 † Longchaeus jamaicensis (Dall, 1896) 
 Longchaeus maculosus (Lamarck, 1822)
 Longchaeus mazatlanicus (Dall & Bartsch, 1909)
 † Longchaeus menadensis (Schepman, 1907) 
 † Longchaeus obtusatus (O. Semper, 1861)
 Longchaeus obtusus (Laseron, 1959)
 † Longchaeus olssoni (Maury, 1917)
 † Longchaeus plicosus (Bronn, 1838) 
 Longchaeus suturalis (H. C. Lea, 1843)
 Longchaeus turritus (A. Adams, 1854)
 † Longchaeus unisulcatus (Dujardin, 1837) 
Species brought into synonymy
 Longchaeus calesi Bartsch, 1955: synonym of Longchaeus suturalis (H. C. Lea, 1843)
 Longchaeus canaliculatus (Sowerby II, 1874): synonym of Longchaeus insularum (Pilsbry, 1922)
 † Longchaeus marionae Bartsch, 1955: synonym of Longchaeus suturalis (H. C. Lea, 1843)
 Longchaeus pricena (Laseron, 1959): synonym of Longchaeus obtusus (Laseron, 1959)
 Longchaeus punctatus (Schubert & J. A. Wagner, 1829): synonym of Longchaeus acus (Gmelin, 1791)
 Longchaeus schanderi (van Aartsen, Gittenberger & Goud, 1998): synonym of Pyramidella inopinata (Schander, 1994)
 Longchaeus sulcatus (A. Adams, 1854): synonym of Longchaeus maculosus (Lamarck, 1822)

References

 Dautzenberg, P. (1923). Liste préliminaire des mollusques marins de Madagascar et description de deux espèces nouvelles. Journal de Conchyliologie 68: 21-74
 Laseron C.F. (1959). Family Pyramidellidae (Mollusca) from Northern Australia. Australian Journal of Marine and Freshwater Research. 10(2): 177-267
 Robba E. (2013) Tertiary and Quaternary fossil pyramidelloidean gastropods of Indonesia. Scripta Geologica 144: 1-191
 Landau B.M. & LaFollette P.I. (2015). The Pyramidellidae (Mollusca: Gastropoda) from the Miocene Cantaure Formation of Venezuela. Cainozoic Research. 15(1-2): 13-54

External links
 To World Register of Marine Species
 Miocene Gastropods and Biostratigraphy of the Kern River Area, California; United States Geological Survey Professional Paper 642 
 Mörch O.A.L. (1875). Synopsis molluscorum marinorum Indiarum occidentalium imprimis insularum danicarum. Malakozoologische Blätter, 22: 142-184.
 Dall W.H. 1889. Reports on the results of dredging, under the supervision of Alexander Agassiz, in the Gulf of Mexico (1877-78) and in the Caribbean Sea (1879-80), by the U.S. Coast Survey Steamer "Blake", Lieut.-Commander C.D. Sigsbee, U.S.N., and Commander J.R. Bartlett, U.S.N., commanding. XXIX. Report on the Mollusca. Part 2, Gastropoda and Scaphopoda. Bulletin of the Museum of Comparative Zoölogy at Harvard College, 18: 1-492, pls. 10-40://www.biodiversitylibrary.org/item/25505

Pyramidellidae